Coronavirus in Saudi Arabia may refer to:
2012 Middle East respiratory syndrome coronavirus outbreak, coronavirus outbreak which originated from Saudi Arabia in 2012
2018 Middle East respiratory syndrome outbreak, coronavirus outbreak which originated from Saudi Arabia in 2012
COVID-19 pandemic in Saudi Arabia, which began in 2020